William Leybourne may refer to:

William de Leybourne (1250–1309), English Knight and military commander
William Leybourne Leybourne (1744–1775), British colonial governor

See also
William Leybourn (1626–1716), English mathematician and land surveyor, printer, and bookseller